Wayne Thomas Moynihan (born October 13, 1947) is a New Hampshire politician.

Early life
Moynihan was born and raised in Belmont, New Hampshire.

Education
Moynihan earned a B.A. from the University of New Hampshire in 1970, a master's degree from Central Michigan University in 1975, and a J.D. from the University of New Hampshire School of Law in 1985.

Military career
Moynihan has served in the United States Air Force in the Vietnam War.

Professional career
Moynihan practiced law from 1985 to 2016. Moynihan served in the New Hampshire House of Representatives from 1996 to 1998. On November 6, 2012, Moynihan was elected to the New Hampshire House of Representatives where he represents the Coos 2 district. Moynihan assumed office on December 5, 2012. Moynihan is a Democrat. Moynihan endorses Bernie Sanders in the 2020 Democratic Party presidential primaries.

Personal life
Moynihan resides in Dummer, New Hampshire.

References

Living people
New Hampshire lawyers
People from Belmont, New Hampshire
University of New Hampshire School of Law alumni
Central Michigan University alumni
Democratic Party members of the New Hampshire House of Representatives
Military personnel from New Hampshire
20th-century American politicians
21st-century American politicians
20th-century American lawyers
21st-century American lawyers
1947 births